Events in the year 1983 in Norway.

Incumbents
 Monarch – Olav V
 Prime Minister – Kåre Willoch (Conservative Party)

Events
 18 March – Arnfinn Nesset is convicted of poisoning 22 patients with Curacit, a muscle relaxing drug, at a Geriatric institution in Orkdal, Norway where he was the director since 1977. Nesset was sentenced to 21 years in prison; the maximum punishment possible by Norwegian law.
 8 June – Willoch's Second Cabinet was appointed.
 18 August – Much of the Archbishop's Palace in Trondheim burned down.
 Municipal and county elections are held throughout the country.
 Dagbladet switched to tabloid format.
 100 years since the foundation of the Norwegian State Railways.

Popular culture

Sports

Music

Film

Literature

Events
Odd Abrahamsen, poet, is awarded the Riksmål Society Literature Prize.
Karin Bang, poet and novelist, is awarded the Gyldendal's Endowment literature prize.

Novels
Kjartan Fløgstad – U 3
Herbjørg Wassmo – Det stumme rommet

Short stories
Merethe Lindstrøm – Sexorcisten og andre fortellinger

Notable births
11 January – Kristian P. Wilsgård, businessman and politician.
27 March – Maria Bodøgaard, television presenter
30 March – Siri Seglem, handball player.
20 April – Gaute Ormåsen, singer
1 July – Marit Larsen, singer and songwriter
20 July – Stig-André Berge, wrestler.

Notable deaths

3 January – Ludvig Ellefsrød, politician (born 1894)
16 January 
Gunnar S. Gundersen, painter (born 1921)
Arnfinn Severin Roald, politician (born 1914)
24 January – Johan Grøttumsbråten, skier and multiple Olympic gold medallist (born 1899)
10 February – Paul Oskar Lindberget, politician (born 1895)
7 March – Odd Lundberg, speed skater and Olympic silver medallist (born 1917)
9 March – Lars Elisæus Vatnaland, politician (born 1892)
7 April – Einar Hareide, politician (born 1899)
12 April – Jørgen Juve, international soccer player and Olympic bronze medallist (born 1906)
14 April – Kåre Hatten, cross-country skier (born 1908).
17 April – Kittill Kristoffersen Berg, politician (born 1903)
25 April – Hans Struksnæs, sailor and Olympic silver medallist (born 1902)
23 May – Finn Mortensen, composer, critic and educator (born 1922)
26 May – Asbjørn Lillås, politician (born 1919)
12 June – Conrad Bonnevie-Svendsen, priest and politician (born 1898)
23 June – Sverre Steen, historian (born 1898).
25 June – Oddbjørn Hagen, skier, Olympic gold medallist and World Champion (born 1908)
16 August – Ragnvald Skrede, author, journalist, literary critic and translator (born 1904)
26 August – Hans Christian Henriksen, businessperson (born 1909)
10 September – Torstein Selvik, politician (born 1900)
12 September – Hans Borgen, politician (born 1908)
2 October – Helga Stene, educator (born 1904).
4 October – Per Hagen, politician (born 1899)
14 October – Halldis Stenhamar, journalist (born 1894).
16 October – Øivin Fjeldstad, conductor and violinist (born 1903)
17 October – Sonja Hagemann, literary historian and literary critic (born 1898)
20 October – Otto Aasen, Nordic skier (born 1894)
7 November – Einar Tommelstad, high jumper (born 1909)
18 November – Leo Tallaksen, politician (born 1908)
26 November – Oddmund Hoel, politician (born 1910)
10 December – Tolv Aamland, politician (born 1893)
21 December – Kjell Bondevik, politician and Minister (born 1901)

Full date missing
Christian Astrup, economist and politician for Nasjonal Samling (born 1909).
Rasmus Nordbø, politician and Minister (born 1915)
Hans Fredrik Wirstad, veterinarian (born 1897)

See also

References

External links